Rebecca Bowman may refer to:

Rebecca Bowman, fictional character in Zoo (TV series)
Rebecca Bowman, fictional character in Banshee (TV series)